The 1995 Harlow District Council election took place on 4 May 1995 to elect members of Harlow District Council in Essex, England. This was on the same day as other local elections. The Labour Party retained control of the council, which it had held continuously since the council's creation in 1973.

Election result

All comparisons in vote share are to the corresponding 1991 election.

Ward results

Brays Grove (2 seats)

Great Parndon

Katherines With Sumner

Kingsmoor

Latton Bush

Little Parndon

Mark Hall North

Mark Hall South

Netteswell East

Old Harlow (2 seats)

Passmores

Potter Street

Stewards

Tye Green

References

1995
1995 English local elections
1990s in Essex